The House and Merit Order of Duke Peter Frederick Louis (German: Haus und Verdienstorden von Herzog Peter Friedrich Ludwig) or proper German Oldenburg House and Merit Order of Duke Peter Frederick Louis (German: Oldenburgische Haus- und Verdienstorden des Herzogs Peter Friedrich Ludwig) was a civil and military order of the Grand Duchy of Oldenburg, a member state of the German Empire. The order was founded by Grand Duke Augustus of Oldenburg on 27 November 1838, to honor his father, Peter Frederick Louis of Oldenburg. It became obsolete in 1918 after the abdication of the last grand duke.

Description
The badge of the order was a white-enameled cross pattée, edged in gold. The cross had a blue enameled center medallion with the crowned monogram of the Peter Frederick Louis in gold. Around the center medallion was a red-enameled ring bearing the motto "Ein Gott, Ein Recht, Eine Wahrheit" ("One God, One Law, One Truth").  Both the center medallion and the ring were edged with a gold rim. On the reverse, the coat of arms of Oldenburg were painted on the medallion.  Each arm on the reverse carried dates written in a cursive script: "17 Jan. 1775", "6 Juli 1785", "21 Mai 1829", and "27 Nov. 1838".  These dates corresponded to the dates of birth, accession to the throne and death of Peter Frederick Louis, as well as the date of the founding of the order.

The star of the order was an eight-pointed silver star bearing the medallion of the badge.

The ribbon of the order was deep blue with a narrow red stripe near each edge.

Classes

The order came in seven classes: Grand Cross with Crown (Großkreuz mit der Krone), Grand Cross (Großkreuz), Grand Commander (Großkomtur), Commander (Komtur), Officer (Offizier), and Knight 1st and 2nd Class (Ritter 1. und 2. Klasse).  The Grand Cross with Crown and the Grand Cross consisted of a sash badge and breast star. The  Grand Commander consisted of a neck badge and breast star, while the Commander was the neck badge without the star.  The Officer's Cross, added in 1903, was a pinback breast badge and differed from the other badges by having a blank reverse and no crown.  The Knight 1st and 2nd Class were breast badges, and the 2nd Class differed from the 1st class by not having a crown and being in silver instead of gold (the monogram and motto remained gold, however).

A special chapter of the order, the capitular knights, open only to Oldenburgers, had a badge which consisted of the medallion, surrounded by a green enameled wreath of oak leaves. It came in several classes whose badge differed in whether it was gold or silver and whether it was crowned.

Associated with the order were honor crosses for lower-ranking military personnel and civilians. The honor crosses were in gold, silver and iron. In 1910, gold, silver and bronze medals were added as additional lower-ranking awards.

All grades of the order except the medals could be awarded with swords for war merit.  The swords were applied diagonally between the arms of the cross. If a recipient of a lower grade with swords received a higher grade without, he wore "swords on ring" on the higher award. These were crossed swords above the badge, usually on the ring from which the badge was suspended (in the case of the Officer's Cross, they were affixed to the top arm). In October 1918, an additional provision was made for a war decoration of a wreath of laurels affixed to the badge and breast star.

Recipients

Grand Crosses 

 Abbas II of Egypt
 Abdulaziz
 Prince Adalbert of Bavaria (1828–1875)
 Prince Adalbert of Prussia (1811–1873)
 Prince Adalbert of Prussia (1884–1948)
 Duke Adolf Friedrich of Mecklenburg
 Adolphe, Grand Duke of Luxembourg
 Adolphus Frederick V, Grand Duke of Mecklenburg-Strelitz
 Albert I of Belgium
 Prince Albert of Prussia (1809–1872)
 Prince Albert of Saxe-Altenburg
 Albert of Saxony
 Prince Albert of Prussia (1837–1906)
 Albrecht, Duke of Württemberg
 Alexander II of Russia
 Alexander III of Russia
 Alexander Frederick, Landgrave of Hesse
 Alexander of Battenberg
 Duke Alexander of Oldenburg
 Prince Alexander of Prussia
 Grand Duke Alexei Alexandrovich of Russia
 Prince Alfons of Bavaria
 Alfred I, Prince of Windisch-Grätz
 Alfred, 2nd Prince of Montenuovo
 Bernhard III, Duke of Saxe-Meiningen
 Theobald von Bethmann Hollweg
 Herbert von Bismarck
 Otto von Bismarck
 Leonhard Graf von Blumenthal
 Max von Boehn (general)
 Walther Bronsart von Schellendorff
 Bernhard von Bülow
 Karl von Bülow
 Eduard von Capelle
 Leo von Caprivi
 Carol I of Romania
 Charles I of Württemberg
 Charles Augustus, Hereditary Grand Duke of Saxe-Weimar-Eisenach (1844–1894)
 Chlodwig, Prince of Hohenlohe-Schillingsfürst
 Christian VIII of Denmark
 Christian X of Denmark
 Christoph, Prince of Schleswig-Holstein
 Duke Constantine Petrovich of Oldenburg
 Rudolf von Delbrück
 Edward VII
 Prince Eitel Friedrich of Prussia
 Duke Elimar of Oldenburg
 Prince Ernest Augustus, 3rd Duke of Cumberland and Teviotdale
 Ernest Louis, Grand Duke of Hesse
 Ernst I, Duke of Saxe-Altenburg
 Ernst II, Duke of Saxe-Altenburg
 Eduard von Fransecky
 Archduke Franz Ferdinand of Austria
 Franz Joseph I of Austria
 Frederick VII of Denmark
 Frederick VIII of Denmark
 Frederick Augustus II, Grand Duke of Oldenburg
 Frederick Francis II, Grand Duke of Mecklenburg-Schwerin
 Frederick Francis III, Grand Duke of Mecklenburg-Schwerin
 Frederick Francis IV, Grand Duke of Mecklenburg-Schwerin
 Frederick I, Duke of Anhalt
 Frederick III, German Emperor
 Prince Frederick of Prussia (1794–1863)
 Prince Frederick of Württemberg
 Frederick William IV of Prussia
 Frederick William, Grand Duke of Mecklenburg-Strelitz
 Prince Frederick of the Netherlands
 Friedrich Ferdinand, Duke of Schleswig-Holstein
 Prince Friedrich Leopold of Prussia
 Georg II, Duke of Saxe-Meiningen
 Georg Alexander, Duke of Mecklenburg
 George V of Hanover
 George Albert, Prince of Schwarzburg-Rudolstadt
 Prince George of Prussia
 George, King of Saxony
 Gustaf VI Adolf
 Prince Harald of Denmark
 Leopold Freiherr von Hauer
 Prince Henry of Prussia (1862–1929)
 Prince Henry of the Netherlands (1820–1879)
 Paul von Hindenburg
 Henning von Holtzendorff
 Dietrich von Hülsen-Haeseler
 Isma'il Pasha
 Prince Joachim of Prussia
 Archduke John of Austria
 Prince Johann of Schleswig-Holstein-Sonderburg-Glücksburg
 John of Saxony
 Duke John Albert of Mecklenburg
 Archduke Joseph Karl of Austria
 Joseph, Duke of Saxe-Altenburg
 Georg von Kameke
 Karl Anton, Prince of Hohenzollern
 Karl, Duke of Schleswig-Holstein-Sonderburg-Glücksburg
 Hans von Koester
 Grand Duke Konstantin Nikolayevich of Russia
 Leopold I of Belgium
 Leopold II of Belgium
 Leopold IV, Duke of Anhalt
 George Maximilianovich, 6th Duke of Leuchtenberg
 Louis III, Grand Duke of Hesse
 Louis IV, Grand Duke of Hesse
 Erich Ludendorff
 Ludwig I of Bavaria
 Ludwig III of Bavaria
 Luitpold, Prince Regent of Bavaria
 Edwin Freiherr von Manteuffel
 Georg von der Marwitz
 Duke William of Mecklenburg-Schwerin
 Grand Duke Michael Alexandrovich of Russia
 Milan I of Serbia
 Helmuth von Moltke the Elder
 Prince Moritz of Saxe-Altenburg
 Georg Alexander von Müller
 Nicholas II of Russia
 Nicholas Alexandrovich, Tsesarevich of Russia
 Grand Duke Nicholas Konstantinovich of Russia
 Grand Duke Nicholas Nikolaevich of Russia (1831–1891)
 Grand Duke Nicholas Nikolaevich of Russia (1856–1929)
 August Ludwig von Nostitz
 Otto of Greece
 Grand Duke Paul Alexandrovich of Russia
 Duke Paul Frederick of Mecklenburg
 Duke Peter of Oldenburg
 Philipp, Prince of Eulenburg
 Karl von Plettenberg
 Prince Frederick William of Hesse-Kassel
 Antoni Wilhelm Radziwiłł
 Albrecht von Roon
 Rupprecht, Crown Prince of Bavaria
 Reinhard Scheer
 Eberhard Graf von Schmettow
 Gustav von Senden-Bibran
 Grand Duke Sergei Alexandrovich of Russia
 Grand Duke Sergei Mikhailovich of Russia
 Dmitry Shcherbachev
 Archduke Stephen of Austria (Palatine of Hungary)
 Otto Graf zu Stolberg-Wernigerode
 Alfred von Tirpitz
 Grand Duke Vladimir Alexandrovich of Russia
 Alfred von Waldersee
 Wilhelm II, German Emperor
 Wilhelmina of the Netherlands
 William I of Württemberg
 William I, German Emperor
 William II of Württemberg
 Prince William of Baden (1829–1897)
 Prince William of Hesse-Philippsthal-Barchfeld
 William, Duke of Brunswick
 William, Prince of Hohenzollern
 Friedrich Graf von Wrangel
 Duke Eugen of Württemberg (1846–1877)

Commanders 

 Wilhelm Heye
 Oskar von Hutier
 Hans von Kirchbach
 Hubert von Rebeur-Paschwitz
 Alfred von Schlieffen
 Julius von Verdy du Vernois

Knights 1st Class 

 Joachim von Amsberg (general)
 Friedrich Boedicker
 Alexander von Falkenhausen
 Friedrich Ritter von Haack
 Fritz von Loßberg

Knights 2nd Class 

 Franz Ritter von Epp
 Heino von Heimburg
 Erich Raeder
 Otto Schultze
 Alf Scott-Hansen Sr.

Unclassified 

 Christian Griepenkerl
 Karl Wilhelm Heinrich von Kleist
 Peter II, Grand Duke of Oldenburg
 Arkady Skugarevsky

References and notes

 This article incorporates information translated from the 4th Edition of Meyers Konversations-Lexikon, a German encyclopedia now in the public domain published between 1885-1892 by the Bibliographisches Institut Leipzig und Wien.
 Robert Werlich, Orders and Decorations of all Nations (Quaker Press, 2nd edition 1974).
 Das Kapitularzeichen des Haus und Verdienst Ordens des Herzogs Peter Friedrich Ludwig, an article on the badge of the capitular knights from the website Imperial German Orders, Medals & Decorations / Kaiserlich Deutsche Orden & Ehrenzeichen

Peter Frederick
Awards established in 1838
1838 establishments in Germany